Paddy Durcan (born 1994) is a Gaelic footballer who plays for Castlebar Mitchels and at senior level for the Mayo county team. He started at Left Half Back in the 2016 All-Ireland Senior Football Championship Final and again in the 2017 All-Ireland Senior Football Championship Final, both against Dublin. He has also played in both the 2013-14 All-Ireland Senior Club Football Championship and the 2015-16 All-Ireland Senior Club Football Championship with his club Castlebar Mitchels.

References

1994 births
Living people
DCU Gaelic footballers
Gaelic football backs
Mayo inter-county Gaelic footballers